Popular Front for the Rebirth of Central African Republic (FPRC) is a rebel group in the Central African Republic which controls areas of the northern part of the country, until 2021 based in N'Délé.

History 
The FPRC was formed on 10 July 2014 in Birao, consolidating the member forces' control over the northern prefectures. They were one of the parties of the February 2019 peace deal. In September 2019, they lost control of Birao. On 17 February 2020 FPRC fighters tried to recapture Birao by attacking local MINUSCA forces. Their attack was repelled and 12 fighters were killed.

On 17 December 2020, an FPRC faction led by Noureddine Adam joined the Coalition of Patriots for Change, while the faction led by Abdoulaye Hissene remained committed to the 2019 peace agreement. Pro-CPC forces of general Mahamat Salleh took control of Bakouma on 31 December 2020 and then Bangassou on 3 January 2021.

Organization 
The FPRC operates a parallel state in the northern part of the Central African Republic. They have their own police, gendarmes, prisons, and military bases. They also collect taxes and fees. They profit from gold and diamond mines in areas they control including Ndassima mine, which they share control with the UPC.

References

External links 
 Central African Republic: The way of the warlord. France24

Factions of the Central African Republic Civil War
Rebel groups in the Central African Republic
Rebel groups that actively control territory